The 1972 Canadian federal budget for fiscal year 1972-1973 was presented by Minister of Finance [John N. Turner] in the House of Commons of Canada on 8 May 1972. It was the last budget before the 1972 Canadian federal election, and included tax cuts for corporations, and aid for the elderly and post-secondary students.

External links 

 Budget Speech
 Budget Highlights

References

Canadian budgets
1972 in Canadian law
1972 government budgets
1972 in Canadian politics